Madecassophryne is a monotypic genus of frogs in the family Microhylidae. It is represented by the single species,  Madecassophryne truebae.
It is endemic to Madagascar.
Its natural habitats are subtropical or tropical moist lowland forests, subtropical or tropical moist montane forests, and rocky areas.
It is threatened by habitat loss.

References

Cophylinae
Amphibians described in 1974
Monotypic amphibian genera
Endemic frogs of Madagascar
Taxa named by Jean Marius René Guibé
Taxonomy articles created by Polbot